Satyrium is the generic name of two groups of organisms and may refer to:

 Satyrium (butterfly), a genus of butterflies in the family Lycaenidae
 Satyrium (plant), a genus of plants in the family Orchidaceae